Kommissar X Drei grüne Hunde, also known  as Death Trip and Kill Me Gently is a 1967 West German-Italian-French-Lebanese-Hungarian international co-production Eurospy film written, co-produced and co-directed by Rudolf Zehetgruber and Gianfranco Parolini.  Filmed in Turkey, it stars Tony Kendall and Brad Harris. It is the fourth of seven films, loosely based on the Kommissar X detective novel series from the Pabel Moewig publishing house. The film also features Dietmar Schonherr, director/screenwriter Rudolf Zehetgruber and Harris' wife of the time Olly Schoberova.

Plot
New York Police Department Captain Rowland travels to Istanbul to bring a shipment of LSD to be used by the American armed forces stationed in Turkey for undisclosed purposes.  When the shipment is stolen by a local and ancient criminal organisation known as "the Green Hounds", Rowland teams up with private eye Joe Walker to recover the shipment.

Cast 

Tony Kendall ... Joe Louis Walker, aka Kommissar X
Brad Harris as Captain Rowland
Olly Schoberova 	... Leyla Kessler
Christa Linder 	... Gisela
Dietmar Schonherr 	... Allan Hood / George Hood
Herbert Fux 	... Eddie Shapiro
Sabine Sun 	... Joyce Sellers
Rossela Bergamonti ... Jenny Carter

Emilio Carrer 	... Inspector Rebat
Carlo Tamberlani 	... Konsul Snyder
Rolf Zehett ... Almann
Andrea Aureli 	... Sergeant Özkan
and Samson Burke 	... Khemal

Theme song in opening credits
"Angela Monti sings the Joe Walker's theme by Bobby Gutesha"

References

External links

1967 films
1960s spy action films
Italian spy action films
German spy action films
West German films
1960s Italian-language films
1960s German-language films
Films directed by Gianfranco Parolini
Films directed by Rudolf Zehetgruber
Films shot in Istanbul
Films about drugs
Films set in Istanbul
Films based on German novels
Films scored by Francesco De Masi
1960s spy thriller films
1960s buddy films
1960s Italian films
1960s German films